Sport Club do Recife, (known as Sport Recife or Sport, is a Brazilian sports club, located in the city of Recife, in the Brazilian state of Pernambuco. Founded in 1905, the club currently plays in Série B. 

In football, the club has won six CBD/CBF titles, including three national and three regional. Its greatest achievements are winning the 1987 Brazilian Championship and 2008 Copa do Brasil. In addition to professional football, the club also participates in women's football and Olympic sports, such as rowing, swimming, hockey, basketball, futsal, volleyball, table tennis, taekwondo, judo and athletics.

Their historical rival is Santa Cruz, and they both dispute the Clássico das Multidões. The derby against Náutico is called the Clássico dos Clássicos, while the derby with América is called the Clássico dos Campeões.

History

Foundation and early years
Sport Club do Recife was founded on 13 May 1905 by Guilherme de Aquino Fonseca, a member of a wealthy family in Pernambuco who found a love for football while studying engineering at the University of Cambridge in England. The club were the first recorded football club in the state of Pernambuco. Sport played their first match on 22 June 1905, drawing 2–2 against a team called English Eleven, a team formed by employees working for English companies in Recife.

The Campeonato Pernambucano was established in 1916, and Sport won the competition's first two titles. From 1923 to 1925, Sport won the competition three consecutive times, and became tricampeão (three time champion).

International tours and military government years 

Sport Recife celebrated their 50th anniversary in 1955 by winning their 15th state title. In 1957, the club toured Europe. A  total of 17 matches were played, with 6 wins, 3 draws, and 8 defeats. These matches include the 5–3 loss against Real Madrid, which was the first night game at Santiago Bernabéu Stadium.

Sport Recife participated in the 1963 International Soccer League, finishing fourth in their group, with 2 wins, 2 draws, and 2 defeats.

As a result of a dispute with the Federação Pernambucana de Futebol (FPF), Sport did not participate in the 1978 Campeonato Pernambucano.

First National league title

The 1987 Campeonato Brasileiro/Copa União resulted in Sport's first national title, conquered in common justice. However, the club did not officially receive this title until 30 years later, in 2017. This was due to a dispute with Flamengo, who also claimed to have won the title, since the latter, champion of the 1987 championship, as well as the vice Internacional, refused to compete in a quadrangular crossing with the finalist teams of Series B, in the case of Sport and Guarani. After topping group B in both the 1st and 2nd rounds Sport beat Bangu 5–4 on aggregate in the semi-final, and then Guarani 3–2 in the final. By winning the title, they qualified for the 1988 Copa Libertadores, but failed to qualify for the next stages of the competition, finishing in 15th place overall.

A terrible 1989 league campaign resulted in the club's relegation. However, they won the 1990 Série B,  with a 1–1 draw on aggregate against Atlético Paranaense in the final, but were awarded the title due to their better record across the season. Led by Givanildo Oliveira, Sport won the 1st edition of the Copa do Nordeste in 1994, beating hosts CRB on penalties after a 0–0 draw in normal time.

21st century
In 2000, Sport won the Copa do Nordeste for the 2nd time, this time under the command of coach Celso Roth after a 2–2 draw against Vitória, again winning the title due to a superior record. In the next Copa do Nordeste edition, Sport finished as runner up, losing 3–1 to Bahia. 

In 2006, after five years in Série B (the Brazilian second division), Sport Club do Recife finished second. Sport had the same number of points as state rivals Náutico, but a better goal difference, and were promoted to Série A.

Sport became the first club from Northeastern Brazil to win the Copa do Brasil, beating Corinthians on away goals in the 2008 final. By winning the cup, Sport contested its second Copa Libertadores in 2009, and had a great start, finishing first of a group containing LDU, Colo-Colo and Palmeiras. They were drawn against Palmeiras in the next round, but were defeated on penalties, after drawing 1–1 on aggregate. In the second half of 2009, Sport disputed the Brasileirão, but could not repeat the excellent 1st half, and finished in last place, being relegated to Série B as a result.

After a poor first half, O Leão da Ilha returned to Série A in 2011. Over the season the club had three different managers - Helio dos Anjos, Mazola Júnior, and PC Gusmão. Although they were in Serie B, Sport inherited a spot in the 2013 Copa Sudamericana by regulation of CBF towards the remnants of the Copa do Brasil. However, as the club had not planned to dispute it, it was not prepared for its first participation, and Leão were eliminated by Libertad of Paraguay with two losses in the 2nd phase, after eliminating Náutico. 

2014 was a great year for Sport: they returned to Serie A, won their third Copa do Nordeste, 40th Campeonato Pernambucano, and finished 11th in the league, which ensured them a place in the Copa Sudamericana. Sport entered the 2015 Copa Sudamericana in the second stage, where they beat Bahia 4–2 on aggregate with an incredible comeback, as Bahia had won the first leg 1–0. In the next stage, they faced Argentine club Club Atlético Huracán. In the first leg played in Brazil, the match ended in a 1–1 draw. However the second leg in Buenos Aires ended in a 3–0 defeat, resulting in the club's elimination from the competition.

Vigor Gang
In 2021, Sport had an illustrious fan who became known nationally for participating in the TV show (Big Brother Brasil), Gil do Vigor. With his charisma and debauched way, he also showed the country his affection for the club of his heart: Sport. He was honored by the Club, and recognized as a symbol fan of the team and of Gay Pride.
Today Sport Recife is also remembered as the "Turminha do Vigor", a team with a vision of the future, without prejudices that embraced its origin and history.

Honours

National

 Campeonato Brasileiro Série A 
1987

 Campeonato Brasileiro Série B: 1
1990

 Copa do Brasil: 1
2008

Regional

 Copa do Nordeste: 3
1994, 2000, 2014

 Torneio Norte-Nordeste: 1
1968

State
 Campeonato Pernambucano: 42
1916, 1917, 1920, 1923, 1924, 1925, 1928, 1938, 1941, 1942, 1943, 1948, 1949, 1953, 1955, 1956, 1958, 1961, 1962, 1975, 1977, 1980, 1981, 1982, 1988, 1991, 1992, 1994, 1996, 1997, 1998, 1999, 2000, 2003, 2006, 2007, 2008, 2009, 2010, 2014, 2017, 2019

Other

 Copa Pernambuco: 3
1998, 2003, 2007

Current squad

First team

Reserve team

Out on loan

Technical staff

Current technical staff

Top scorers

Supporters
In 2013, a study named Sport Recife as the 13th most supported club in Brazil, with around 2.4 million supporters countrywide. The supporters of Sport are called Crimson-black, Leonine and Sportista.

The club has various organized supporter groups:

Rivalries

Santa Cruz
The Derby of Crowds (Clássico das Multidões) is a duel that often leads many people to Pernambuco. Sport has a considerable advantage in relation to its archrival, with a number exceeding a 60 win differential. It is the second largest difference in rivalry matches of Brazilian football. Their last match was on March 31, 2021, which ended with the score of 2x1 for Sport, in the Estádio do Arruda, Recife, Pernambuco. Sport got the breakthrough in the first half with Rafael Thyere, only to see Santa Cruz draw the match in the second half with a goal from Chiquinho, from a penalty kick. But, in added time, there was a controversial penalty for Sport, and Jonas Toró scored the winning goal.

Náutico
The Derby of Derbies (Clássico dos Clássicos) is the third oldest derby in the country, second only to Clássico Vovô and Grenal. This brings together the two oldest teams in Pernambuco, with Sport also having a big difference of advantages over its archrival: more than 20 wins. Their most recent match was in May 23, 2021, in the Estádio dos Aflitos, Recife, Pernambuco. The second leg match in the final of the Campeonato Pernambucano 2021 was headed to a 0x0 draw, but Kieza opened the scoring for Náutico with less than 15 minutes remaining. When many thought Náutico were already the champions, Sport got the equaliser goal with Mikael, on the 86th minute. The final was decided on penalty shootouts (the first match was also 1x1), and Náutico won 5-3.

América-PE
The Champions Derby (Clássico dos Campeões) is one of the most ancient and classical derbies of Pernambuco, and is named that way because until the late 1930s, Sport and its archrival America were together the two teams with the highest number of titles, and were also the two main clubs of Recife. The derby lost popularity after the decline of América-PE, since they haven't won any  trophies since the 1940s. América are currently at the second division of the Campeonato Pernambucano.

Esporte Clube Bahia
The rivalry between both clubs is one of the most important regional rivalries of Brazil. Both are the most successful clubs in the Northeast football, being the only two clubs in the region to have won national titles, and the clubs with most supporters across the region. The 2010s marked the growth of their rivalry, as both clubs' supporters saw their state rivals declining in comparison to them. Another important aspect about the rivalry is that Pernambuco and Bahia have their own rivalry, ranging from which is the most important state in the northeast region to which state deploys the best carnival in the country. The rivalry between states are nurtured the most between inhabitants of the state capitals, Recife and Salvador, which also are the cities where Sport Recife and Bahia are based.

Facilities

Stadium

Avenida Malaquias

The stadium was Opened on May 15, 1918, where America-PE beat Flamengo 3–1. It belonged to Sport Recife from 1918 until 1937, and had a capacity for 8,000 people (2000 being seated).

Adelmar da Costa Carvalho Stadium (Ilha do Retiro Stadium)

Better known as Ilha do Retiro, it is the club's current stadium, and is Located in the neighborhood of Ilha do Retiro in Recife. It was considered the best stadium until the construction of the Arena Pernambuco, which is currently the bestthe Northeast, because of its structure and FIFA standards.
The stadium Ilha do Retiro, inaugurated on July 4, 1937, has a maximum  capacity of 30,000 people.

Training Center
CT Presidente José de Andrade Médicis (CT do Leão)

The CT Presidente José de Andrade Medici, also known as CT do Leão, is the club's training center for the professional team and all youth levels. located in the city of Paulista, about 30 km from Recife, the site has a total area of 8 hectares (8,000 m2). Currently, the CT faces structural and access problems, mainly on rainy days. The complex underwent major improvements in recent years, to prepare for the 2013 FIFA Confederations Cup and 2014 FIFA World Cup.

The complex has 5 official fields, two hotels, a restaurant, a medical center, a gym, and dressing rooms. The training center was inaugurated on September 9, 2008.

Symbols

Motto
Article 2 of the 1st chapter says- Sport Club do Recife will seek to maintain and elevate the crimson-black spirit, under the slogan Pelo Sport Tudo! (For Sport Everything!).
The motto most likely has its origins that coincides with the onset of a war cry.

Badge
The first coat of arms had nothing to do with the current one. In one of the first statutes of the club the coat of arms was well defined: "On an anchor, bearing the date May 13, 1905 on the arm, supported by a pair of oars crossing a mast containing a croquette, a lifeguard, and in the center a football between a cricket stick and a tennis racket, crossed and surrounded by the letters SCR, with the body containing the phrase 'Sport Club Recife'. Soon, the number 1 badge represented all sports practiced by the club at the time, from cricket to spearfishing.

However, the coat was seen as too complex, difficult to reproduce and did not contain the crimson-black colors. So in 1919 then President Arnaldo Loyo faced a challenge that was considered extremely difficult at the time: get Sport to Belém do Pará to play a series of five friendlies.

The club achieved significant results, since at the time football in Pará was more developed than the Pernambuco one. These were the results: Sport 3–3 Remo-Paysandu Combination (March 23), Sport 3–2 Selecao Paraense (March 27), Sport 0–1 Paysandu (April 1), Sport 2–1 Remo-Paysandu Combination (April 3) and Sport 0–1 Remo (April 6).

In the game on April 3, 1919, a French bronze trophy called the Lion of the North , which had sculptures including a Greek archer accompanied by an imposing lion, was up for grabs. To the surprise of Pará, Sport won 2–1 and got the trophy. The disappointment from opposing fans was such that a fan invaded the ship where the Crimson-Black club kept the trophy, and damaged its tail with an iron pipe. This inspired the development of a new coat for the sport. So the lion was adopted as the new symbol of the club because it represented boldness, courage and winning spirit. Designer Armando Vieira dos Santos was responsible for creating it, which was based on Scottish heraldry arms.

The stars present in the current badge are: 2 gold stars, for its two major titles (1987 Brasileirao Serie A and 2008 Copa do Brasil) and 1 silver star, for its minor titles (1990 Brasileirao Série B). The golden stars are larger than the silver one, and are located on the corners, while the silver star is smaller and is located in between the golden stars.

Flag
Sport's flag is well described in its charter: Article 9 of Chapter 2 says – "Sport Club do Recife has as official flag; rectangular in shape, with seven horizontal stripes parallel of equal width, four black and three red, alternately the first and last of which in black color. In the top right corner flag, a black square, with the heraldic figure of a lion standing in gold, turned to the right of the square, holding the club's logo in black. The background of the logo is in gold, with the SCR monogram appearing in the center in black letters. In the lower right corner of the square, the inscription in gold, of the number '1905', foundation year of the club."

In the official anthem of the Sport Club do Recife, the author Eunitônio Edir Pereira makes a nice quote to the flag:

Eterno símbolo de orgulho
(Eternal symbol of pride)
É o pavilhão
(Is the flag)
De listras pretas e vermelhas,
(Black and red stripes,)
Com o Leão
(With the Lion)
Erguendo, imponente, o imortal escudo
(Lifting, imposing the immortal shield)
Mostrando a gente que o Sport é tudo
(Showing the public that the Sport is everything)
Que a vida tem de belo  oferecer
(What beautiful things life has to offer)
Sport, Sport
(Sport, Sport)
Uma razão para viver
(A reason to live)

Mascots
In 1919 in Para, the club won the Lion of the North Trophy a competition which at the time was considered very difficult for any team from Pernambuco, as football in Para was more developed. Sport then went to Belem and won the French bronze trophy, which would later be the reason for creating the mascot, the lion, as well as the creation of one of the nicknames of Sport: Leão do Norte (Lion of the North).

The mascot is called Leo. It was created over 25 years ago by cartoonist Humberto Araujo, and since then has been illustrating the achievements and highlights of the club.
Leo is present at all home games of the club, and entertains the crowd at matches. The name Leo means lion in Latin.

Supporters Day
In 2008, Sport Supporter Day was founded, through the Law No. 17.415/2008, and bill No. 249/2005. The commemorative date coincides with the date of the founding of the club.

Colors & Uniforms
Article 6 of the 2nd chapter says: The official colors of Sport Club do Recife will always be black and red, used together, in uniforms, shields, badges, pennants, flags, etc...

The uniforms of Sport are described in Article 8 of the 2nd chapter: In sports competitions, athletes from Sport Club do Recife will wear an official uniform, which will always have the SCR shield on their shirt, on their left side and at chest level, and obeys one of the following uniforms:

a) Shirt with black and red stripes, with white or black shorts and black socks;

b) White shirt, shorts and socks

c) Black shirt, shorts and socks, with red accents;

d) Golden shirt, shorts and socks, with discreet red and black details;

Kit Manufacturers
 Penalty (1973–74)
 Malharia Terres (1977–80)
 FAIXA (1980)
 Adidas (1980–82)
 Le Coq Sportif (1983–87)
 Everest (1987)
 MR Artigos Esportivos (1988–89)
 Topper (1988–92)
 Finta (1992–94)
 Rhumell (1995–98)
 Topper (1998–08)
 Lotto (2008–2013)
 Adidas (2014–2017)
 Under Armour (2018)
 Umbro (2019–Current)

Kit sponsors
1983: AVIS (in some games) and Federal Seguros (in some games)
1985–92: Banco Banorte
1993–94: Coca-Cola
1995–97: Tintas Renner
1998: Excelsior Seguros
1999: Sonrisal
2000: Saúde Excelsior (in the Copa dos Campeões) and Bauducco (in the quarter-finals of the Copa João Havelange)
2001: TAM (in some games)
2002: Tupan (in the game of Copa do Brasil), TIM and Direct (in the Copa do Nordeste)
2003: Hexal Genéricos
2004: Lemon Bank and Moura Dubeux
2005: Cimento Nassau, Boate Metrópole
2006: Cimento Nassau, Rota do Mar and Moura Dubeux
2007: Cimento Nassau, Minasgás, Rota do Mar and Moura Dubeux, Frevo, Prefeitura do Recife, Nordeste Segurança (in some games)
2008: Cimento Nassau. Minasgás, CNA (in some games) and TOTVS (in the final of the Copa do Brasil)
2009: Cimento Nassau, CNA (in some games), Shineray
2010: Cimento Nassau, Supergasbras, Shineray, BMG, Mec-tronic, Mycrocred
2011: BMG, Supergasbras, Shineray, Mycrocred, Farmácias Guararapes (Finals of the Campeonato Pernambucano), Webmotors.
2012: MRV Engenharia, EletroShopping, Tintas Iquine, Shineray, Brasilit.
2013: Eletroshopping, Shineray, BioGarnier (games in the second stage of the Campeonato Pernambucano), BMG and Mycrocred (in the second game of the finals of the Campeonato Pernambucano).
2014: Caixa Econômica Federal
2020: Gazin, Zaeli, Foxlux, Excelsior Seguros, JBS Veículos, Minha Casa Financiada and GAV Resorts

Presidents 
This is a list of Sport Recife presidents since 2000:

 Luciano Bivar (1997-01)
 Fernando Pessoa (2001-02)
 Severino Otavio (Branquinho) (2003-04)
 Luciano Bivar (2005-06)
 Milton Bivar Caldas (2007-08)
 Silvio Alexandre Guimaraes (2009-10)
 Gustavo Dubueux (2011-12)
 Luciano Bivar (2013) 
 Joao Humberto Martorelli (2014-16)
 Arnaldo Barros Jr. (2017-18)
 Gustavo Dubueux (2019-)

Publications about Sport
 Books
 SILVESTRE, Rafael. Copa do Brasil 2008 – Há cinco anos o Brasil era rubro-negro. BB Editora, São Paulo, 2013.
 FILHO, Costa. Meu Coração de Leão – Memórias de um Paraibano Louco pelo Sport. Mídia Gráfica e Editora, João Pessoa, 2013.
 BIVAR, Fernando Caldas. Coração Rubro-negro: "A união faz o Leão". Independente, Recife, 2005.
 CORDEIRO, Carlos Celso e; GUEDES, Luciano. Sport – Retrospecto – 1905 a 1959. Recife, 2005.
 CORDEIRO, Carlos Celso e; GUEDES, Luciano. Sport – Retrospecto – 1960 a 1979. Recife, 2006.
 CORDEIRO, Carlos Celso e; GUEDES, Luciano. Sport – Retrospecto – 1980 a 1999. Recife, 2007.
 SANTOS, Manoel Heleno Rodrigues dos. Memória Rubro-negra (1905–55). M. Inojosa Editora, Recife, 1985.
 SANTOS, Manoel Heleno Rodrigues dos. Memória Rubro-negra II (1956–88). Editora Universitária da UFPE, Recife, 1992.
 SOUZA, Carlos Enrique de. Histórias da Garra Rubro-negra. Editora Comunicarte, Recife, 1993.

References

External links

 
Football clubs in Pernambuco
Association football clubs established in 1905
1905 establishments in Brazil
Torneio Norte-Nordeste winners
Copa do Brasil winning clubs
Campeonato Brasileiro Série A winning clubs